"Tetrachlorodecaoxide" (TCDO) is a chlorite-containing substance with claimed immunomodulatory, macrophage-activating properties. WF10 (Macrokine, Immunokine, Oxoferin) is an aqueous solution of tetrachlorodecaoxide designed for intravenous injection. Tetrachlorodecaoxide/WF10 were originally developed by Oxo Chemie. The chemical formula is given as Cl4H2O114-. This incomplete formula shows a mixture of chlorite ion, water, and molecular oxygen: "Cl4H2O114-" = 4ClO2− + H2O + O2. Oxoferin was found to be equivalent with aqueous sodium chlorite.

Tetrachlorodecaoxide / WF10 is used in the management of radiation cystitis, is effective in the treatment of diabetic foot ulcers, and is used in wound healing, where the mechanism of action is activation of the macrophage system, and increasing the partial pressure of oxygen in the wound.

References

External links 
 
 Tetrachlorodecaoxide at Drugs.com

Chlorites
Immunomodulating drugs